Pretty Baby may refer to:

 Pretty Baby (1950 film), a comedy film featuring Dennis Morgan and Betsy Drake
 Pretty Baby (1978 film), a drama film featuring Brooke Shields
 Pretty Baby (soundtrack), a soundtrack album from the film
 "Pretty Baby....", an episode of EastEnders
 Pretty Baby (album), an album by Dean Martin
 "Pretty Baby" (Vanessa Carlton song) (2003)
 "Pretty Baby" (Tony Jackson song) (1916)
 "Pretty Baby" (The Primettes song)
 "Pretty Baby", a song by Blondie from Parallel Lines
 "Pretty Baby", a song by Kool & The Gang from As One